"Here Comes Heaven" is a song performed by American contemporary worship band Elevation Worship. On November 30, 2018, the song was released as the fifth single from their eleventh live album, Hallelujah Here Below (2018), to Christian radio stations in the United States. The song was written by Aaron Robertson, Chris Brown, and Steven Furtick. Chris Brown and Aaron Robertson handled the production of the single.

Background
Elevation Worship first released a live performance video of the song recorded during a worship service at Elevation Ballantyne on December 28, 2017.
The song was released by Elevation Worship on Hallelujah Here Below on September 28, 2018. Chris Brown spoke of the song, saying: "I love the message the Christmas season carries –– that 2,000 years ago God entered into our broken, messy lives. "Here Comes Heaven" is a joyful declaration that He's still doing the same today."

Writing and development
Chris Brown had an interview with Kevin Davis, a lead contributor at NewReleaseToday about the song and the inspiration behind it. Davis asked about the personal story behind the song, to which Brown responded, saying:

Composition

Commercial performance
"Here Comes Heaven" made its debut at number 41 on Billboard's Christian Airplay chart dated December 8, 2018. It went on to peak at number 27 on the chart, and spent a total of five weeks on the Christian Airplay chart.

"Here Comes Heaven" debuted at number 39 on Billboard's Hot Christian Songs chart dated December 22, 2018. It went on to peak at number 36 on the chart, and spent a total of three weeks on the Hot Christian Songs chart.

Music videos
The audio video for the "Here Comes Heaven" was availed on Elevation Worship's YouTube channel on September 28, 2018. On November 2, 2018, Elevation Worship released the live music video of "Here Comes Heaven" recorded at Elevation Church's Ballantyne campus on its YouTube channel.

Charts

Release history

References

External links
 

2018 singles
Elevation Worship songs
Songs written by Steven Furtick
2018 songs